Little Scioto River may refer to any of several streams in the state of Ohio in the United States:

Little Scioto River, a tributary of the Ohio River.
Little Scioto River, a tributary of the Scioto River.
Ohio Brush Creek was known historically as the Little Scioto River.

See also 
 Scioto River